The 9th century BC started the first day of 900 BC and ended the last day of 801 BC. It was a period of great change for several civilizations. In Africa, Carthage is founded by the Phoenicians. In Egypt, a severe flood covers the floor of Luxor temple, and years later, a civil war starts.

It is the beginning of the Iron Age in Central Europe, with the spread of the Proto-Celtic Hallstatt culture, and the Proto-Celtic language.

Events

890s BC 
 899 BC: The first year of King Yih of Zhou's reign is marked by a solar eclipse.
 892 BC: Megacles, King of Athens, dies after a reign of 30 years and is succeeded by his son Diognetus.
892 BC: King Xiao of Zhou overthrows King Yih of Zhou and takes the throne.
 891 BC: Tukulti-Ninurta II succeeds his father Adad-nirari II as king of Assyria.
 890 BC: Napoli some reports and excavations about the foundation of the city

880s BC 
 887 BC: Soshenq II succeeds Osorkon I as king of Egypt.
885 BC: Takelot I succeeds Soshenq II as king of Egypt.
885 BC: King Yi of Zhou, son of King Yih, is restored to the throne.
 884 BC: Ashurnasirpal II succeeds his father Tukulti-Ninurta II as king of Assyria.

870s BC 
 879 BC: Death of King Yi of Zhou, King of the Zhou Dynasty of China.
 878 BC: King Li of Zhou becomes King of the Zhou Dynasty of China.
 874 BC: Osorkon II succeeds Takelot I as king of the Twenty-second dynasty of Egypt.
 874 BC: Ahab becomes king of Kingdom of Israel (approximate date).
 872 BC: Parshvanatha, 23rd Tirthankara of Jainism was born.
 872 BC: An exceptionally high flood from the Nile covers the floors of the Temple of Luxor.

860s BC 
 865 BC: Kar Kalmaneser was conquered by the Assyrian king Shalmaneser III.
 864 BC: Diognetus, Archon of Athens, dies after a reign of 28 years and is succeeded by his son Pherecles.
 860 BC: The kingdom of Urartu is unified.

850s BC 
 858 BC: Aramu becomes king of Urartu.
 858 BC: Shalmaneser III succeeds Ashurnasirpal II as king of Assyria.
 854/3 BC: Battle of Karkar—An indecisive engagement between Assyrian king Shalmaneser III and a military alliance of the king of Damascus and lesser powers including the prince of Tyre. (Either 854 or 853 BC)
 850 BC: Takelot II ascends to the throne of Upper Egypt
 850 BC: The Middle Mumun Pottery Period begins in the Korean peninsula.
 850 BC: Tagaung Kingdom is founded by Abhiyaza of the Sakya clan of the Buddha in 850 BCE, present-day northern Burma at the upper banks of the Irrawaddy river.

840s BC 
 845 BC: Pherecles, Archon of Athens, dies after a reign of 19 years and is succeeded by his son Ariphron.
 842 BC: Shalmaneser III devastates the territory of Damascus; Kingdom of Israel and the Phoenician cities send tribute.
 841 BC: Death of King Li of Zhou, King of the Zhou Dynasty of China.
 841 BC: Records of the Grand Historian regards this year as the first year of consecutive annual dating of Chinese history.
 840 BC: Gopala Dynasty started in Nepal, first dynasty to rule in a country named Nepal despite its present geographical boundaries.

830s BC 
 836 BC: Shalmaneser III of Assyria leads an expedition against the Tabareni.
 836 BC: Civil war breaks out in Egypt.

820s BC 
 827 BC: King Xuan of Zhou becomes King of the Zhou Dynasty of China.
 825 BC: Takelot II, king of Egypt, dies. Crown Prince Osorkon III and Shoshenq III, sons of Takelot, battle for the throne.
 c. 825 BC: Ariphron, King of Athens, dies after a reign of 20 years and is succeeded by his son Thespieus.
 823 BC: Death of Shalmaneser III, king of Assyria. He is succeeded by his son Shamshi-Adad V.
 820 BC: Pygmalion ascends the throne of Tyre.

810s BC 
 817 BC: Pedubastis I declares himself king of Egypt, founding the Twenty-third Dynasty.
 814 BC: Carthage is founded by Dido (traditional date).
 811 BC: Adad-nirari III succeeds his father Shamshi-Adad V as king of Assyria.

800s BC 
 804 BC: Adad-nirari III of Assyria conquers Damascus.
 804 BC: Death of Pedubastis I, pharaoh.
 c. 800 BC: Etruscan civilization.
 Beginning of the Iron Age in Central Europe, spread of the Proto-Celtic Hallstatt culture, and the Proto-Celtic language.
 Adena culture appears in present-day Northeastern United States.

Inventions, discoveries, introductions
First inscriptions in Epigraphic South Arabian found in Akkele Guzay
9th century BC—Olmecs build pyramids.
9th century BC - Canal for transport constructed in Ancient China.
Emergence of the Brahmana period of Vedic Sanskrit, probable composition of the Shatapatha Brahmana, and the first beginning of the Upanishadic and Vedantic traditions of Hinduism.
9th century BC -- Parshvanath gives Jain philosophy of Karma theory, Vows of Sramana (Ahimsa, Asteya, Aparigraha, Satya)

In works of fiction
 In Highlander, the immortal Juan Sánchez Villa-Lobos Ramírez (Sean Connery) was born in Egypt in 896 BC.
 In True Blood, the vampire known as Russell Edgington was born around 850 BC, and was turned about 800 BC.

Sovereign states

See: List of sovereign states in the 9th century BC.

Notes

References
 

 
-1
-91